Xonotla may refer to:
 Xonotla, Puebla
 Xonotla, Soledad Atzompa
 Xonotla, Tezonapa
 Xonotla, Zacatlán